Saadi Younis (1 July 1953 – 8 October 2019) was an Iraqi footballer who played for Iraq in the 1974 Asian Games. He was a member of the Iraq national football team between 1973 and 1975.

References

Iraqi footballers
Iraq international footballers
Footballers at the 1974 Asian Games
1953 births
2019 deaths
Asian Games competitors for Iraq
Association footballers not categorized by position